Crazy Woman may refer to:

 "Crazy Woman" (song), a 1974 rock song
 Crazy Woman Creek, an American river

See also

 "Crazy Women"